The Milford Dam is a dam on the Penobscot River between Old Town and Milford in Penobscot County, Maine. The dam will receive a new fish lift as a part of an extensive project involving four dams to restore eleven species of sea-run fish to the Penobscot River. The Great Works Dam was removed in 2012 and was just downstream of the Milford Dam. The dam's power plant has an 8 MW installed capacity.

References

Dams in Maine
Penobscot River
Buildings and structures in Old Town, Maine
Dams completed in 1906
1906 establishments in Maine